Polly Roy OBE is a professor and Chair of Virology at The London School of Hygiene and Tropical Medicine. She attended a number of schools which included Columbia University Medical School, Rutgers University, University of Alabama, and University of Oxford.  In 2001 she became a part of The London School of Hygiene and Tropical Medicine and, along with being the chair of Virology, is also the co-organiser of the medical microbiology course.
The virus that she has dedicated most of her career to is Bluetongue disease that affects sheep and cattle. She became interested in this virus after attending a symposium and was intrigued by the fact that not much was known about the virus that was causing such a nasty and sometimes fatal disease.

Education

Roy went to Presidency College in Calcutta, India, where she was born. Thereafter, she received a scholarship to study at New York University where she received her PhD in Molecular Virology. Whilst studying biological sciences she met biologist Sol Spiegelman. Roy then spent three years in a post-doctoral position in RNA Virology at Waksman Institute of Microbiology at Rutgers University. After her post-doctoral work, she went to the University of Alabama at Birmingham to begin her own Blue Tongue Virus research group. She became a professor at University of Alabama at Birmingham in 1987. Roy then received the Fogarty Fellowship at the University of Oxford in 1997 where she established a second virology lab. In 2001 Roy moved to The Department of Pathogen Molecular Biology at the London School of Hygiene and Tropical Medicine as a Virology professor where she leads a research groups.

Research 
Throughout her career, Roy has improved understanding on basic molecular and cell biology, replication and the transmission of a variety viruses.

Her research has led to advances in the development of improved diagnostic assays, more efficacious virus-like protein (VLP) vaccines, vaccines for Bluetongue and African Horse sickness virus (AHSV) and the possibility of other therapeutics relating to these diseases.

Roy's research has been published in multiple highly acclaimed journals alongside contributing to several published books as a guest writer/editor.

Roy's current research includes gaining a clearer understanding around the blue tongue virus at a molecular level, the potential for developing vaccines for Bluetongue virus and the African Horse sickness virus, RNA-RNA interactions and packaging, cell entry and transcription activation of non-enveloped dsRNA viruses and defining the cis and trans acting factors in the assembly of the Bluetongue virus.

Research interests  
RNA Virology
Viral Genetics
Protein Function & Capsid Assembly
Replication of Segmented Genome & Packaging
Virus Trafficking in Host Cell
Technology Development & Generation of Particulate Vaccines

Contributions to our understanding of Blue Tongue Virus
Viral Structure 
Viral Assembly
RNA Replication
Virus Release
Supervised Post-doctoral & Post-graduate Researchers
Published close to 300 Research Papers
Served on Many Different Scientific Organizations, Committees, & Boards
Organized International Conferences
In 2006 Dr. Polly Roy was elected a Fellow of the Academy of Medical Sciences for Conference on Viral Assembly
Delivered a talk at Women in Health 2018 Lecture series - How a virus works: a journey

Honours and awards

 Senior Investigator Award from the Wellcome Trust (2012)
 Recipient of the Indian Science Congress General President's Gold Medal, awarded by the Prime Minister of India (2012)
 'Innovator of the Year' Finalist, Biotechnology and Biological Sciences Research Council (BBSRC) (2012)
The Indian Science Congress General President's Gold Medal
 Officer of the Order of the British Empire (OBE) in the 2014 Birthday Honours, for services to virus research
 Elected Fellow of the Society of Biology (2014)

References

Year of birth missing (living people)
Living people
Indian virologists
Indian women microbiologists
New York University alumni
Academics of the London School of Hygiene & Tropical Medicine
University of Alabama at Birmingham faculty
Academics of the University of Oxford
Scientists from Kolkata
Bengali chemists
20th-century Indian biologists
20th-century Indian women scientists
21st-century Indian biologists
Women scientists from West Bengal
21st-century Indian women scientists